Bakke may refer to:

Places

Denmark
Amager Bakke, a waste-to-power incinerator plant in Copenhagen, Denmark
Bispebjerg Bakke (building), an apartment complex in Copenhagen, Denmark

Norway
Bakke, Norway, former municipality in Vest-Agder county in Norway
Bakke Abbey in Trondheim, Norway
Bakke Church (Trondheim), a church in Trondheim municipality in Sør-Trøndelag county, Norway
Bakke Church (Vest-Agder), a church in Flekkefjord municipality in Vest-Agder county, Norway

US
Bakke Mountain, a summit in Florida, Massachusetts
Bakke Graduate University in Dallas, Texas

Other uses
 De Bakke, an area near Hermanus, South Africa
Bakke (surname)

See also
Regents of the University of California v. Bakke, a landmark US Supreme Court case